Oluf "Luffe" Olsen (born 31 December 1957 in Frederiksberg) is a Danish curler.

At the national level, he is a eight-time Danish men's champion curler (1977, 1981, 1983, 1987, 1988, 1993, 1994, 1995). He is also a three-time Danish junior champion curler (1976, 1978, 1979).

He participated at the demonstration curling event at the 1988 Winter Olympics, where the Danish men's team finished sixth.

Teams

References

External links

Living people
1957 births
Sportspeople from Frederiksberg
Danish male curlers
Danish curling champions
Curlers at the 1988 Winter Olympics
Olympic curlers of Denmark
20th-century Danish people